is a series of platform games starring the sushi chef Umihara Kawase, who has become lost in a world of surreal salt-water and fresh-water creatures. The series began with Umihara Kawase for the Super Famicom in 1994, which was followed by Umihara Kawase Shun in 1997, Sayonara Umihara Kawase in 2013, Umihara Kawase Fresh! in 2019, and Umihara Kawase Bazooka! in 2020.

Development
The game was an independent collaboration between developer Kiyoshi Sakai, illustrator Toshinobu Kondo, and several others. It was published by TNN, "Think about Needs of Notice for human being".

Gameplay
The game world of Umihara Kawase is constructed from a set of interconnected levels known as fields. Each field connects to one or more fields deeper within the game via doors.

Fields are enclosed areas containing a number of static and moving platforms, ladders, spikes, enemy sea-life and one or more exit doors. The doors are often positioned in hard to reach places and it is the player's goal to plan a safe route to one. Each exit door in a field takes the player to a different field, and the goal is to find a safe route through the fields and arrive at a final exit door (at which point the credits scroll and the game is over). Each of the Umihara Kawase games contains multiple routes through the fields and multiple final exits. Using shortcuts and optimised door routes can allow the game to be completed within minutes in the hands of a skilled player; however, enjoyment of the game typically lies not in merely making it to the first or easiest final exit door, but in exploring the game's many routes and mastering the challenging rope physics.

The Umihara Kawase games have simple controls. The eponymous player character is able to run, jump, climb onto ledges, climb ladders and, crucially, throw her fishing line. When thrown, the fishing line will hook onto nearly all surfaces within the games. When the line is firmly hooked onto a surface or an enemy fish the line is able to take her weight. From here Umihara is able to swing between platforms, lower herself down to other ledges and swing herself up to higher ledges. Due to the flexible nature of her line she can also catapult herself great distances by stretching the line to breaking point. The line can also be used to stun fish and reel them in, and once reeled in Umihara will store them in her rucksack and score points in doing so.

While the controls are simple and responsive, an uncompromising physics model means that graceful control of the game's swinging techniques will not come immediately. Out of this, though, comes great scope for advanced techniques through full utilization of the physics. Perfect execution of techniques such as the one- and two-step rocket jump are required both in later fields and for those who intend to improve their field completion times.

The games contain 1ups in the shape of Umihara's pink rucksack but no other collectibles are present.

Umihara Kawase

Umihara Kawase is the first game in the series released in 1994 for the Super Famicom. It was originally in development for the X68000. Umihara Kawase contains a total of 49 fields of which four are exit fields and six are boss fields. The game makes good use of the SFC's colour palette for digitized photographic backgrounds. The rope physics sometimes strain the Super Famicom's CPU, leading to slowdown, but this is rare. The game permits saving speedruns, establishing such play as a principal feature of the series.

The game, along with Shun, was ported for PC in 2015. The slowdown from the Super Famicom version is no longer present though the game remains largely the same with the addition of a practice mode.

Umihara Kawase Shun

Umihara Kawase Shun (海腹川背・旬  Umihara Kawase Shun;  shun means "in season") is the second game in the series released in 1997 for the PlayStation and developed by the same team as the original. The move to a 3D side-on game world with the PlayStation launch of Shun opened up the fields to more complex layouts using a great deal of angled and jutting blocks. The move to a 3D game world was not universally welcomed, however, as it decreases the ease with which the player can identify the exact point in space where platforms begin and end. Slightly adjusted line physics (the rope is shorter, but more elastic and springy), along with no presence of slowdown, are the other main notable changes from its predecessor.

Umihara Kawase Shun ~second edition~ Maruan Series 1
The second edition was launched almost three years after Shun at a lower price as part of the Maruan series and contains some notable changes. This release contains five additional fields taking the total to fifty five. The game's cut-scenes have been replaced with scrollable, static art of the protagonist, however, due to the removal of all Mitchell branding. The defunct Japanese magazine TECH  PlayStation Extra contained three new fields in each of its June, July and August 1997 issues' demo discs, along with guides to complete them.

Umihara Kawase Portable

Although another re-release of Shun, Umihara Kawase Portable nevertheless disappointed fans and critics alike on release, due to a bug-ridden physics engine, which differed in crucial aspects to its predecessors. Further criticism was leveled at the new visual perspective, which sometimes interfered with play.
On July 14, 2008, it was announced that the game would be coming to North America under the title Yumi's Odd Odyssey, however, this release never came about. It would have been the first Umihara Kawase game to have been released outside of Asia.

Umihara Kawase Portable was not developed by Super Famicom and PS version developer, Kiyoshi Sakai, instead being developed by Rocket Studio. Many Japanese fans felt anxious about Umihara Kawase Portable prior to release, and were disappointed and angry afterwards. Accordingly, they protested Marvelous Entertainment sales agency and Motion Bank, and staged a boycott.

Umihara Kawase Shun ~second edition~ Kanzenban

A DS Umihara Kawase compilation was released on October 29, 2009. Both the SFC and PlayStation games are present, along with some extra levels, and wireless exchange of data is also supported. The development of the port was overseen by original designer/programmer Kiyoshi Sakai, with additional artwork from Toshinobu Kondou. The DS port has been far better received by fans of the series than the PSP port, as it is a much more faithful conversion.

Sayonara Umihara Kawase

A third game in the series called  was announced in March 2013, likely a response to the more successful Nintendo DS compilation release of the first two games. Half of the original staff were involved in its development . The game includes a cast of playable characters including a younger Umihara Kawase, her classic self, her future descendant named Noko Yokoyama, and her childhood friend Emiko. The gameplay is similar to past games. It was released in Japan on June 20, 2013, for the Nintendo 3DS.

The game was also released outside of Asia; it was the first game in the series to do so. Natsume confirmed that they would release the game in North America under the same title they originally planned for the PlayStation Portable release: Yumi's Odd Odyssey. It was later confirmed that Agatsuma Entertainment were to publish the game themselves for the European market under its original Japanese title, unlike the North American release. The game was eventually released in North America, Europe and Australia exclusively for Nintendo eShop on March 20, 2014, and April 24, 2014, respectively.

The 3DS version was eventually ported to the PlayStation Vita as Sayonara Umihara Kawase Chirari (さよなら 海腹川背 ちらり). This version also included the first game in the series. The port was published by Agatsuma in Japan in both physical and digital format, while American and European releases were digital only on PlayStation Network. Agatsuma also dropped the Yumi's Odd Odyssey name, calling it Sayonara Umihara Kawase + in western releases on its release in April 2015. A version for Microsoft Windows has also been announced for October 2015. In addition the previous two titles in the series will also receive ports.

In November 2018, publisher Strictly Limited Games released Sayonara UmiharaKawase++ for the Vita. This version, denoted by the extra "+", features even more extra content in the form of artwork.

Umihara Kawase Fresh!

On September 5, 2018, Success announced a new game in the series, entitled Umihara Kawase Fresh!, for release on Nintendo Switch in Japan on April 25, 2019. It was released in Europe and North America on July 9, 2019, from Nicalis. A PlayStation 4 port was subsequently announced on August 9, 2019. It was released in Japan on April 23, 2020 and May 15, 2020, in Europe, and on October 30, 2020, in North America. A Microsoft Windows port of the game was released worldwide on May 28, 2020.

Other  media
 Umihara Kawase Hyper Technique guidebook (. Publication: 29 March 1995).
 Stray Sheep Volume 5 - Happy Angel (Toshinobu Kondo Personal Works). This edition of the Japanese illustration magazine contains works by Toshinobu Kondo, many of which are of Umihara Kawase (cover included).
 Umihara Kawase Shun Capture Guidebook (. Publisher: T2 Publishing Co. Ltd. Publication: March 31, 1997). Full colour guide book includes gameplay basics, enemies, field maps with routes and "Toshinobu Kondo presents" artwork section.
 Umihara Kawase Shun Perfect Guide Book (. Publisher: Shinseisha. Publication: March 1997). Full colour three part techniques section, monochrome field maps and guide.
 TECH PlayStation Extra CD-ROM magazine. The June, July and August 1997 issues (SLPM-80100, SLPM-80108, and SLPM-80117) of this Japanese publication contain 3 new fields each along with information on techniques required to complete them.
 Kawase, Noko and Emiko appear as playable characters in the crossover fighting game Blade Strangers. A second version of Kawase, "Summer Kawase", became playable in a later game update.
 Kawase appears as a playable character in the crossover puzzle game Crystal Crisis''.

Notes

References

External links
 Umihara Kawase Shun PlayStation.jp product page.
 Umihara Kawase Shun second edition PlayStation.jp product page.

1994 video games
Nintendo 3DS eShop games
Nintendo 3DS games
Nintendo DS games
Nintendo Network games
Nintendo Switch games
Nintendo Switch Online games
Platform games
PlayStation 4 games
PlayStation (console) games
PlayStation Network games
PlayStation Portable games
PlayStation Vita games
Super Nintendo Entertainment System games
TNN games
Video game franchises
Video games developed in Japan
Video games featuring female protagonists
Windows games
Video game franchises introduced in 1994